The Central Electoral Commission of Kyrgyzstan, officially the Central Commission on Elections and Referenda of the Kyrgyz Republic, is the body in Kyrgyzstan responsible for the running of elections. In the run up to the 2007 Kyrgyz Parliamentary elections the Commission was accused of suppressing the political opponents of President Kurmanbek Bakiyev.

References

Elections in Kyrgyzstan
Election commissions